Trapped by G-Men is a 1937 American crime film directed by Lewis D. Collins and starring Jack Holt, Wynne Gibson, and C. Henry Gordon.

Cast
Jack Holt as Martin Galloway   
Wynne Gibson as Alice Segar
C. Henry Gordon as Kilgour
Jack La Rue as Fred Drake
Edward Brophy as Lefty
William Pawley as Harry Grady
Arthur Hohl as Blackie
Robert Emmett O'Connor as Agent Jim
William Bakewell as Dick Withers
Eleanor Stewart as Nancy Higbee

References

External links
 

1937 films
1937 crime films
American crime films
Films directed by Lewis D. Collins
1930s English-language films
Columbia Pictures films
American black-and-white films
1930s American films